The thirteenth, and final season of the Syfy reality television series Face Off (styled as Face Off: Battle Royale) premiered on June 5, 2018. This season features the return of twelve former competitors, who will compete head-to-head against each other throughout the competition.

Contestants

Recurring people
 McKenzie Westmore - Host
 Michael Westmore - Mentor

Judges
 Ve Neill
 Glenn Hetrick
 Neville Page

Contestant Progress

 The contestant won Face Off.
  The contestant was a runner-up.
 The contestant won a Spotlight Challenge.
 The contestant was in the top in the Spotlight Challenge.
 The contestant was declared one of the best in the Spotlight Challenge but was not in the running for the win.
 The contestant was in the bottom in the Spotlight Challenge.
 The contestant was eliminated.
‡ The contestant won their Head to Head Match.

Episodes

External links
 Face Off at Syfy.com

References 

Face Off (TV series)
2018 American television seasons